John Wilson Ntegyereize  (1946 – 6 May 2021) was an Anglican bishop in Uganda. He was Archdeacon then Bishop of Kinkiizi, serving from 1995 unil 2010.

References

1946 births
2021 deaths
Anglican bishops of Kinkiizi
Uganda Christian University alumni
21st-century Anglican bishops in Uganda
20th-century Anglican bishops in Uganda
Anglican archdeacons in Africa